The 2017 Mongolian Premier League (also known as the Khurkhree National Premier League) is the 49th edition of the tournament. Erchim came into the season as defending champions of the 2016 season.

Athletic 220 and Goyoo entered as the two promoted teams from the 1st League. The season started on April 29.

Clubs

Clubs and locations

Personnel and kits

Results

League table

Result table

Top scorers

References

Mongolia Premier League seasons
2017 in Mongolian sport
Mongolia